{
  "type": "ExternalData",
  "service": "page",
  "title": "NZHeaphyTrack.map"
}
The Heaphy Track is a popular tramping and mountain biking track in the north west of the South Island of New Zealand. It is located within the Kahurangi National Park and classified as one of New Zealand's ten Great Walks by the Department of Conservation. The track is open for shared use with mountain bikers in the winter season from 1 May to 30 September each year. The southern end of the track is at Kōhaihai, north of Karamea on the northern West Coast, and the northern end is in the upper valley of the Aorere River, Golden Bay. 

Floods in February 2022 caused major damage to three bridges on the West Coast end of the track, leading to the closure of the section between James Mackay Hut and Heaphy Hut. The rest of the track and all the huts are open, and the track can be accessed for return trips from either road-end. Through travel is currently not possible until the bridges are rebuilt and the damaged section of track repaired.

History
Māori tribes are known to have settled along the lower course of the Heaphy River as early as the 14th century. There is a significant archaeological site near the existing Heaphy Hut that has been the subject of significant investigations. The evidence from these investigations suggests that at least some of the area crossed by today's Heaphy Track had been explored and settled by Māori in pre-European times.  No evidence has yet been found of middens in the Gouland Downs area, however middens have been found at all the main river-mouths south of the Heaphy River. This suggests that the route along the coast had been used regularly by Māori.

The first visit to the area by persons whose names were recorded took place in 1846, when Charles Heaphy, Thomas Brunner and their Māori guide , supported by another guide , explored the coastal sector of the track.

In October 1856, James Mackay and a colleague John Clark explored the headwaters of the Aorere River, in search of a large grassy plan that had been reported by Māori to lie between the Aorere and the West Coast.  They found a large scrub-covered area that was later named the Gouland Downs, but did not travel across it or mark out a route to the West Coast at that time.

The first recorded crossing approximately along today's route was by a European gold miner named Aldrige in 1859. Another crossing by James Mackay took place in 1860. At the time, Mackay was returning from leading the Crown purchase from Māori of all the land on the West Coast within the Nelson province.  His party turned inland at the Heaphy River, and then travelled up the Lewis River to the saddle. From there they crossed the Gouland Downs and descended via the Aorere River back to Collingwood.

The discovery of gold at Karamea in 1861 led to increased interest in the route between Nelson and the West Coast.  In December 1861, Mackay, along with John and Arthur Knyvett, created a rough track between the upper Aorere River and the Heaphy River mouth. The Nelson Provincial Council allocated funding for work on the track in 1866 and 1867, but there is no record of further work on the track until 1885, when the Public Works Department asked the Collingwood County Council to initiate a survey. The Council engaged James Saxon a surveyor from Nelson, and he laid out a route suitable for horse carts from the Brown river to the Gouland Downs, with a grade of 1 in 16.  His plans were approved by the Public Works Department in 1886.

During and after the West Coast Gold Rush of the 1860s the area was extensively visited for gold and the track was definitely laid out by various prospectors and surveyors, among them John Saxon in 1888. No gold was found in the area and, after thirty years, prospecting came to an end. By 1900, the track was virtually forgotten and had become overgrown and seldom used except by an occasional hunter.

The creation of the North-west Nelson Forest Park in 1965, which became Kahurangi National Park in 1996, led to the rediscovery and improvement of the track.

The track is now tramped by thousands of people every year.

Partial track closure in 2022 

In early February 2022, heavy rain in the Buller District caused severe flooding and damage to the track. The suspension bridge over the Gunner River was damaged and the Pitt Creek bridge was swept away, and the suspension bridge over the Heaphy River was destroyed. The flood either washed away or seriously damaged three bridges on the final section of the track between James Mackay and Heaphy Huts. The  bridge across the Heaphy River was the longest suspended deck bridge in the country when it was built in 2013. In addition to the damage to bridges, the severe weather also caused slips and windfall on the track from James Mackay Hut down to the river valley. The section of the track between James Mackay and Heaphy Huts was closed because of the extensive damage, although the rest of the track and huts were re-opened during February for return trips from the two road ends. Through travel is currently not possible until the bridges are rebuilt and the damaged section of track repaired.

Road access

From the south, the road from Karamea to the Kōhaihai River is unsealed for the last , .

From the north, the road from Collingwood to Brown Hut is sealed as far as Bainham, then unsealed for the final . The road access was originally via three fords, but after ongoing concern about drivers taking risks in crossing the fords to get to the track, and some becoming stranded in swollen streams, DOC took the unusual step of providing funding to Tasman District Council for three bridges to be built; these were finished in 2014.

Route 
The track can be travelled in either direction but the route from Golden Bay to Karamea is described here.

Brown Hut to Perry Saddle Hut 

Brown Hut is located only five minutes walk from the carpark at the end of Aorere Valley road. There is a campsite located close to the hut. The track from Brown Hut crosses Brown River and a grassy flat before climbing through regenerating forest. The  route to Perry Saddle is almost entirely uphill, and has a consistent gradient. The zigzag path follows the route of a bridle track surveyed and built in 1886 by John Saxon. The track climbs steadily through mature beech forest, mostly red beech (Nothofagus fusca) and hard beech (Nothofagus truncata) trees, but there are also podocarps including rimu and miro, southern rata and other species such as kamahi. Birds that may be seen in the forest on the climb to Perry Saddle Hut include tomtits, robins and bellbird. Kākā may also be seen or heard near the top. There is a side branch of the track reached after about 90 minutes climbing. This leads down to Shakespeare Flat on the Aorere River. After 3–4 hours climb, the Aorere shelter and campsite at about  elevation provides a place to rest. There is a lookout point nearby. From here, it is another 30 minutes walk to Perry Saddle Hut. The hut has 28 bunks.

Perry Saddle Hut to Gouland Downs Hut 
From the Perry Saddle Hut, the track passes over the saddle and follows the true left of the Perry Creek. There is a side-trip route up to the peak of Mount Perry, at  elevation that in suitable conditions provides panoramic views over the Aorere Valley and Golden Bay towards the North Island, and inland over the Gouland Downs and the rest of the Kahurangi National Park. The main track re-enters forest for about an hour until reaching the edge of the Gouland Downs. The route then descends gradually to the Cave Brook and then reaches the historic Gouland Downs Hut. The existing hut was built by the Collingwood County Council in 1936. There are many limestone arches, caves and small waterfalls that can be accessed near the hut.

Geology of the Gouland Downs 
This area is a peneplain, a low-relief plain formed from prolonged erosion. Beneath the tussock in the Gouland Downs are sandstone and mudstone sedimentary rocks that were formed in the Lower Palaeozoic era around 400 to 500 million years ago. They are some of the oldest rocks in New Zealand. These rocks were worn down by erosion to form the peneplain around 100 million years ago. They were then submerged beneath a shallow sea, and limestone was deposited on top of the older sedimentary rocks. The land was subsequently uplifted, and erosion removed most of the limestone, leaving isolated outcrops that now appear like tree-covered islands in the tussock landscape. The remaining areas of the Gouland Downs have shallow and infertile soil where the only plants that thrive are tussocks and rushes.

Introduction of takahē 
In 2018, the Department of Conservation translocated 30 endangered takahē to the Gouland Downs, from the breeding facility at Burwood Takahē Centre in Southland. This release is part of a programme to ensure the survival of the species. The Gouland Downs area was chosen for the release partly because the Kahurangi National Park has had intensive pest control over many years, and along with natural barriers, this has kept down the population of predators such as cats and ferrets. Takahē can now be regularly seen near Gouland Downs Hut.

Gouland Downs Hut to Saxon Hut 
The track from Gouland Downs Hut continues across the northern part of the Gouland Downs, crossing Shiner Brook, Big River and Weka Creek over swing bridges before descending into the headwaters of the Saxon River and reaching Saxon Hut. The hut is named after John Saxon who surveyed the track in 1886. The endangered blue duck (or whio) may be seen in this section of the route. Great spotted kiwi can often be heard calling in the area around Saxon Hut, and are occasionally seen at night.

Saxon Hut to James Mackay Hut 
The route descends gently through forest to the Saxon River, and then over a flat to Blue Duck Creek. It then climbs through forest in a long sidle around the slopes of Mt Teddy before reaching the Mackay Downs. The James Mackay Hut is on the edge of the downs, and is situated on a terrace above the track. It has views of the Heaphy River mouth and the Tasman Sea to the south-west.

James Mackay Hut to Heaphy Hut 
The track descends through forest along a spur between Deception Creek to the south and the Lewis River to the north. The type of vegetation changes markedly as the track descends towards the Heaphy River. Stunted manuka and beech trees seen at the top become taller, and the sub-canopy and ground vegetation becomes more dense. At the bottom of the descent, there is typical West Coast rainforest, and the first nikau palms can be seen. There is a shelter near the junction of the Lewis and Heaphy Rivers.

The route then crosses the Heaphy River and the track then follows a large bend in the river under limestone bluffs. The track follows the true left of the Heaphy River and crosses the Gunner River near its junction with the Heaphy. The vegetation along this part of the route is lowland podcarp forest, with an increasing number of nikau palms closer to Heaphy Hut, where they dominate the forest. The Heaphy Hut and campsite is around  back from the beach, overlooking the Heaphy River mouth, with a view of surf and the Tasman Sea.

Heaphy Hut to Kōhaihai River mouth 
This final section of the track is all close to the coastline, with the route partly in forest and partly on the beach or beach margins. There are several stream crossings along the route. The Katipo Creek shelter is located at the mid-point of this section of the track. The landscape of the coastline with its pounding surf and the coastal forest with groves of nikau palms is described by some as the highlight of the track. The track the descends to a crossing of the Kōhaihai River and the end of the track at the car park.

Mountain biking
Prior to the establishment of Kahurangi National Park in 1996, mountainbiking was a popular activity on the Heaphy Track. In the final 12 months before the North West Nelson Forest Park became a National Park, around 2000 mountain bikers completed the route. At the time, the National Parks Act 1980 did not permit mountain biking in National Parks, other than on formed roads. Lobbying activities to allow the return of mountain biking on the Heaphy track continued through until 2011, when a three-year trial began. The trial permitted mountain biking during the winter season from 1 May to 30 September. 

The mountain bike trial period ended in 2016 and mountain biking became a permanent option over the colder part of the year. Mountain biking is now allowed each year from 1 May to 30 November for groups not exceeding six riders.

Incidents
The route of the Heaphy Track is subject to high rainfall, and is prone to flooding. Until the 1970s there were significant streams across the track that were not bridged, leading to the risk of trampers becoming stranded, or being swept away while trying to cross a flooded stream.

There was a fatality of a track worker at Kohaihai Bluff in 1919, but there are no recorded deaths from then until the 1960s.

In October 1965, a school teacher from Rockville in the Aorere Valley went missing on the Heaphy Track while attempting to travel on his horse from Karamea back to Rockville. Despite several searches, his body was never found. In March 1972, a visitor from the United States, went missing on the climb up from Brown Hut in poor weather when she became separated from her tramping companion. Despite extensive searches, no trace of her was found. In April 1973, a member of a party from the University of Canterbury Tramping Club was swept away while attempting to cross the flooded Cave Creek. His body was never found. In the report from the subsequent Coroner's enquiry, the Coroner said: "Only fit and well-equipped people should attempt to walk the Heaphy Track".

Controversies in the 1970s about the proposal for a road through Heaphy Track led to increased interest in the track and a large increase in the number of trampers. On one night, there were 82 staying overnight at the Gouland Downs Hut. Around the same time, four people had to be rescued from the track over a period of only two days: one girl with asthma, another girl with glandular fever, a young girl with exposure and a boy with a broken bone in his foot.

In March 1976, a tramper was swept away while attempting to cross the flooded Weka Creek on the Gouland Downs. Her body was never found.

An unusual incident with a happy ending began on 19 January 1980, when a tramper from Palmerston North became disoriented on the descent from Perry Saddle Hut to the end of the track in poor weather and went missing for almost 30 days. His abandoned campsite at Shakespeare Flat on the upper Aorere River was discovered by searchers but he was not found until 18 February – the final day of planned searches. He was flown to hospital, and made a good recovery, being discharged in five days. Only a few weeks later, on 17 March 1980 three young trampers from Auckland died when they were swept off rocks at Crayfish Point, just  from the end of the track at Kōhaihai.

In March 1982, a solo tramper from Canterbury went missing on the track. He had wandered off the path and become lost after leaving Perry Saddle Hut on the way south. He was eventually found by search parties after he had spent nine days lost in the bush. There was another large search in April 1988 for a nurse from Auckland who had started on the track on her own from the Karamea end in mid March, and was last seen at Heaphy Hut. She was reported missing when she did not arrive home after the end of her holiday. The route was in poor condition at the time after a period of heavy rain, and rivers were swollen. A large search failed to find any sign of the missing woman.

Through-road controversy

Between the 1950s and the 1980s, repeated attempts were made by the South Island Local Bodies Association to have the Ministry of Works build an access road along the route of the Heaphy Track. The Ministry considered the road proposal to be too expensive and did not view it as a priority.

The famed coastal strip with its iconic nikau palm groves was particularly at risk with any road construction. Even with simple track construction at Crayfish Point many years ago, the overall effect was to see major slips carry the groves into the sea. Those fighting roading proposals felt this could be the result along the very narrow, palm-covered coastal strip if road construction were to take place.

Up until the 1980s the threats to the track were real, as the local population and councils largely supported roading in the belief that a "tourist circuit" of the South Island would increase the access and popularity of the area. The track proponents argued the damage could never be justified and that the popularity would come more in the form of people being drawn to the area for days rather than those who would drive through and use "comfort stops".

The campaign to "save" the Track and the popular support the conservation effort gathered over many years became pivotal in changing the attitude of the authorities to environmental matters. The New Zealand Government instigated many changes to curb unnecessary environmental destruction.

Following the major campaigns, track use grew substantially. In 1970, a road alignment was surveyed by the Ministry of Works and this caused a period of intense debate. Track use became intense in the 1973–1974 summer season and when a three-day rainstorm hit over the New Year break, it resulted in a massive rescue mission. In the larger huts, hundreds of people were sheltering and the six-bunk Gounland Downs Hut held 82 people. The incident resulted in shelters being built in between the huts.

Recently, track use has moderated to a point where it now forms an integral part of the great New Zealand walking experience. As the popularity increased, more resources were put into track maintenance and facilities. Today, the track is well defined and serviced and capable of being walked by a wide age group. A number of commercial operators now provide guiding facilities and packing ability, thus allowing a wider age group to enjoy this extended walk.

See also
 New Zealand tramping tracks
 Tramping in New Zealand

References

Further reading

External links

 Heaphy Track official website at Department of Conservation
 Heaphy Track recovery work at Department of Conservation
 Heaphy Track at Herenga ā Nuku Aotearoa, the Outdoor Access Commission
 Heaphy Track at New Zealand Tramper

Buller District
Protected areas of the Tasman District
Protected areas of the West Coast, New Zealand
Hiking and tramping tracks in the West Coast, New Zealand
Mountain biking in New Zealand
Kahurangi National Park
Hiking and tramping tracks in the Tasman District